This is a list of the mammal species recorded in Saint Pierre and Miquelon. There are two mammal species in Saint Pierre and Miquelon, both of which are dolphins. There is inadequate information to make an assessment of the risks to either species.

Order: Cetacea (whales) 

The order Cetacea includes whales, dolphins and porpoises. They are the mammals most fully adapted to aquatic life with a spindle-shaped nearly hairless body, protected by a thick layer of blubber, and forelimbs and tail modified to provide propulsion underwater.

Suborder: Odontoceti
Superfamily: Platanistoidea
Family: Delphinidae (marine dolphins)
Genus: Lagenodelphis
 Fraser's dolphin, L. hosei DD
Genus: Grampus
 Risso's dolphin, G. griseus DD

Notes

References

See also
List of chordate orders
Lists of mammals by region
List of prehistoric mammals
Mammal classification
List of mammals described in the 2000s

Saint Pierre and Miquelon
Mammals
Fauna of Saint Pierre and Miquelon
Saint Pierre and Miquelon